Apollonopolis Parva, Apollinopolis Parva, or Little Apollonopolis may refer to two ancient cities in Egypt:
Apollonopolis Parva (Hypselis) in the Hypseliote nome, today known as Qus
Apollonopolis Parva (Coptos) in the Coptite nome

See also
Apollonopolis (disambiguation)